William Murchison is a nationally syndicated political columnist in the United States. Murchison is normally of a conservative political persuasion. He is also a regular contributor to Watchdog.org, Chronicles and The Lone Star Report.

Education
Murchison obtained his degree from Stanford University and the University of Texas.

Career
Prior to retiring in 2001, he worked as an editor for The Dallas Morning News. Murchison has contributed to a number of national publications which include: the Wall Street Journal, National Review, The Weekly Standard, and First Things. He also frequently speaks across the country at colleges and many other forums. He also served, for five years, as a Radford Distinguished Professor of Journalism at Baylor University.

Books
He is the author of several books including:
Mortal Follies: Episcopalians and the Crisis of Mainline Christianity and a volume about the mid-1990s rise of the religious right
Reclaiming Morality in America, 1994, Thomas Nelson Publishers
There's More To Life Than Politics, 1998, Spence Publishing Company
Those Gasoline Lines and how They Got There, 1980, Fisher Institute

Organizations
He is in addition a member of the Philadelphia Society.

References

Year of birth missing (living people)
Living people
American columnists
Place of birth missing (living people)
Stanford University alumni
University of Texas at Austin alumni
Baylor University faculty